Abdul Latif Bin Abdul Malek Bin Omar Al Al Shaikh was the Saudi Minister of Municipal and Rural Affairs and is the third Al Al Shaikh to serve in King Salman's 2015 Cabinet.
Abdul Latif Bin Abdul Malek is a King Saud University graduate where he earned an engineering degree, he first worked as the Program Management Officer of the Riyadh Development Authority before becoming  Director at the ”Center of Significant Projects and Planning“ (Rank 15) at the Riyadh Region Municipality, which was one of the highest posts in the municipal government.

References

Living people
Year of birth missing (living people)
King Saud University alumni
Place of birth missing (living people)
Government ministers of Saudi Arabia